The Erqi Yangtze River Bridge is a highway bridge over the Yangtze River in Wuhan, Hubei Province, China. With two main spans of  it is the world's longest double span cable-stayed bridge.

See also
 Yangtze River bridges and tunnels
 List of largest cable-stayed bridges
 List of tallest bridges in the world

References

Bridges in Wuhan
Bridges over the Yangtze River
Bridges completed in 2011
Cable-stayed bridges in China